The Golden Onion was a Dutch film award that was awarded to the worst Dutch movies, actors and directors. It was intended to counterpoint the Golden Calf-awards, just like the Razzie counterpoints the Academy Awards.

The Award was first awarded in 2005, and was created by a group of Dutch fourth year students from the Netherlands Film and Television Academy. They, along with movie journalists, formed the jury.

References

External links 
De Gouden Ui verkiezing on Bbrussen.nl 
Rob Houwen 

Dutch film awards